Voice is a South Korean crime-thriller television series starring Lee Ha-na, Jang Hyuk, Kim Jae Wook (Season 1), Lee Jin-wook (Season 2 & 3), and Song Seung-heon (Season 4) which follows the lives of 112 emergency call center and dispatch team members as they fight against crimes using the sounds that they hear. It premiered on OCN on January 14, 2017. The first season concluded on March 12. The second season aired from August 11 to September 16, 2018. The third season aired from May 11 to June 30, 2019. The fourth season was premiered on June 18, 2021 and it aired on every Friday and Saturday at 22:50 KST on tvN till July 31, 2021.

Series overview

Synopsis

Season 1
Moo Jin-hyuk (Jang Hyuk) is a "mad dog" detective who becomes guilt-ridden after his wife was murdered while he was at work. Kang Kwon-joo (Lee Ha-na) is a tough policewoman who is gifted with perfect psycho-acoustics skills and went for voice profiling. She was working at the call center when a brutal murder case took place and in the process of investigating, her father was killed. Three years later, Jin-hyuk and Kwon-joo team up as the "Golden Time team" and solve cases together, chasing after the psychopathic serial killer who took their loved ones.

Season 2
The Golden Time team solves urgent real-time incidents from phone calls received through the emergency service line. They race through the precarious time left for crime victims, who are held captive or being chased by their assailants and save them from the imminent danger. One day, a mysterious serial killer named Dr Fabre appears, A voice profiler police and center director of 112 call center, Kang Kwon-joo teams up with Dispatch Team Leader and stubborn Detective Do Kang-woo (Lee Jin-wook)to solve that crime. They try to arrest Dr Fabre while solving other diverse cases, including voice phising, date harassment, and illegal car racing.

Season 3
The Golden Time team solves urgent real-time incidents from phone calls received through the emergency service line. They race through the precarious time left for crime victims, who are held captive or being chased by their assailants, and save them from the imminent danger. One day, the team members face an international evil cartel that is behind a string of cyber crimes. In order to fight against the cartel and save lives within the golden time, a talented voice profiler police Kang Kwon-joo executes instructions to the detective field units, Do Kang-woo and his team.

Season 4
A serial killer with an enhanced hearing ability appears. The serial killer murders people using his enhanced ability. Because of this, Kang Kwon-joo, who also has an enhanced hearing ability, is driven into a corner. Kang Kwon-joo cooperates with Detective Derek Jo (Song Seung-heon) to catch the serial killer. Derek Jo is a person of principle, who doesn't allow mistakes. He is a team leader from the LAPD (Los Angeles Police Department). His LAPD team dealt with criminal gangs.

Cast

Main
 Lee Ha-na as Kang Kwon-joo 
 Choi Myung-bin as young Kang Kwon-joo
 Jang Hyuk as Moo Jin-hyuk (season 1)
 Lee Jin-wook as Do Kang-woo (seasons 2–3)
 Bae Kang-yoo as young Do Kang-woo/Kosuke Matsuda (season 3)
 Song Seung-heon as Derek Jo (season 4)
 Jung Hyeon-jun as young Derek Jo

Supporting

Season 1
112 Report Center's Golden Time Team
 Baek Sung-hyun as Shim Dae-shik, junior detective and Jin-hyuk's close friend
 Yesung as Oh Hyun-ho, IT specialist 
 Son Eun-seo as Park Eun-soo, language specialist 
 Kwon Hyung-joong as Chun Sang-pil

The Police
 Lee Hae-young as Jang Kyung-hak, violent crime unit chief
 Jo Young-jin as Bae Byung-gon, police commissioner
 Kim Joong-ki as Park Joong-ki, violent crime unit detective
 Song Boo-gun as Goo Gwang-soo, violent crime unit detective
 Baek Cheon-ki as Kim Pyeong-jo, violent crime unit detective

Cases characters

Eunhyung-dong Policeman's Wife Murder Case (Ep. 1)
 Oh Yeon-ah as Heo Ji-hye, Jin-hyuk's wife
 Son Jong-hak as Kang Kook-hwan, Kwon-joo's father (special appearance)
 Hwang Sang-kyung as Go Dong-chul, murder suspect
 Kim Jae-wook as Mo Tae-goo, CEO of Sungwun Express
 Song Sung-han as young Mo Tae-goo

Eunhyung-dong Kidnapping Case (Ep. 1–2)
 Kim Tae-han as Jo Gwang-cheon, kidnapper
 Jeon Soo-jin as Park Bok-nim, kidnapped school girl

Burim-dong Child Abuse and Murder Case (Ep. 2–3)
 Bae Jung-hwa as Oh Soo-jin, abusive mother 
 Choi Seung-hoon as Son Ah-ram, abused child 
 Kwon Byung-gil as Baek Sung-hak, security guard

Hongchang-dong Kidnapping Case (Ep. 4–6)
 Lee Joo-seung as Hwang Kyung-il, bespectacled teacher
 Jung Joon-won as young Hwang Kyung-il 
 Han Bo-bae as Park Eun-byul, Eun-soo's younger sister
 Kim Ji-hoon as Woo Bong-gil, accomplice

Surim-dong Chunsoo Townhouse Murder Case (Ep. 6–8)
 Lee Yong-nyeo as Park Bok-soon / Shim Chun-ok, elderly landlord 
 Yoon Kyung-ho as Yoon Pil-bae, tenant
 Park Eun-young as Bang Mal-nyun, woman who called police
 Shin Seung-hwan as Shim Young-woon, Chun-ok's brother

Gwangchang-dong Club Fever Hostage Case (Ep. 9-10)
 Kim Ho-young as Yang Ho-shik, electrician and genius hacker

Bangha-dong Nakwon Welfare Center Case (Ep. 11–12)
 Hong Sung-duk as Baek Jin-goo, mental patient
 Yeo Moo-young as Byun Sang-an / Kang Hyun-pal, welfare center director
 Jo Wan-gi as Kim Gyu-hwan, welfare center therapist
 Lee Na-yoon as Sae-bom, little girl

Woogyeong-ri Bus accident Case (Ep. 14–15)
 Park Noh-sik as Park Jong-woo, Sungwun Express bus driver
 Oh Cho-hee as Na Jung-eun, pregnant bus passenger
 Min Jung-sub as Jung Chul-ho, Na Jung-eun's husband
 Kim Hyun as Im Mi-ho
 Kim Jun-hyuk as Im Mi-ho's son

Others
 Lee Si-woo as Moo Dong-woo, Jin-hyuk's son
 Lee Joo-sil as Eun-soo's grandmother
 Kim Myeong-kuk as Cha Myung-chul
 Choi Ki-sub as Tabloid, Jin-hyuk's informant
 Kim Roi-ha as Nam Sang-tae, CEO of GP development
 Yoon Ji-min as Jang Gyu-ah, Fantasia's lady boss
 Lee Do-kyung as Mo Gi-beom, Chairman of Sungwun Express, Mo Tae-gu's father
 Jang Won-young as Kwon Chang-tae, Director of land planning department
 Kang Moon-kyung as Kim Joon-tae, Minister of land planning
 Kim Yong-woon as Ji Choon-bae, Nam Sang-tae's right-hand man
 Hong Seung-jin as killer from Southeast Asia
 Song Young-kyu as Park Eun-cheol, prosecutor working for Sungwun Group
 Lee Jae-won as Mo Tae-gu's assistant and driver
 Kim Ik-tae as retired forensic doctor
 Lee Ji-hye as 112 report center's Golden Time team member
 Kook Ki-hoon as 112 report center's Golden Time team member

Season 2

 Kwon Yul as Bang Je-soo
 Son Eun-seo as Park Eun-soo, Golden Time team member
 Oh Yoon-hong as Joo Hye-jung	
 Ahn Se-ha as Kwak Dok-ki, Do Kang-woo's friend 
 Kim Woo-suk as Jin Seo-yool, Golden Time team member 
 Yoo Seung-mok as Na Hong-soo, Violent crime unit team leader
 Kim Ki-nam as Yang Choon-byung, Violent crime unit team member
 Kim Joong-ki as Park Joong-ki, Golden Time dispatch team member
 Song Boo-gun as Goo Gwang-soo, Golden Time dispatch team member
 So Hee-jung as Moo Mi-sook
 Cha Min-ji as Go Ye-ji
 Hong Kyung-in as Na Hyung-joon, Do Kang-woo's partner
 Park Tae-sung 
 Joo Min-ha as An Hee-jin

Season 3

 Park Byung-eun as Kaneki Masayuki / Woo Jong-woo
 Kwon Yul as Bang Je-soo
 Son Eun-seo as Park Eun-soo, Golden Time Team - Call Team Command Team Leader 
 Kim Woo-suk as Jin Seo-yul, Golden Time Team member
 Kim Joong-ki as Park Joong-ki, Golden Time Team member
 Song Boo-gun as Goo Kwang-soo, Golden Time Team member
 Kim Ki-nam as Yang Choon-byung, Golden Time Team member
 Yoo Seung-mok as Na Hong-soo, Violent Crimes Unit Chief
 Han Gab-soo as Yoo Jae-cheon, Poongsan Police Commissioner

Others
 Yang Ye-seung as Kaneki Yukiko
 Jung Ki-seop as Suzuki
 Jung Yi-seo as Kwon Se-young
 Im Byung-gi as Yukiko's father
 Hong Seung-hee as Mi-hye
 Park Dong-ha as Detective Ryoji
 Kim Dae-gon as Seung	
 Jung Tae-ya as Jo Young-chun
 Ham Sung-min as Pyo Hyun-soo
 Kim Ji-sung as Yeom Mi-jung
 Carson Allen as Tina
 Yannie Kim as Pertiwi
 Park Myung-shin as Cheon Yoon-mi
 Kim Jin-yeop as Han Cho-rong
 Choi Seung-yoon as Oh Jin-sik (Ep. 7–8)

Season 4

 Lee Yi-dam as Jo Seung-ah, younger sister of Derek Jo
 Lee Kyu-hyung as Dong Bang-min  
 Kang Seung-yoon as Han Woo-ju
  Son Eun-seo as Park Eun-soo
 Gil Hae-yeon as Gam Jong-suk
 Baek Sung-hyun as Shim Dae-sik
Other
 Han Jong-hoon as Chad Lee
 Chae Won-bin as Gong Soo-ji 
 Jo Hyun-woo as Choi Gong-pil 
 Choi Ji-yeon as Gam-soon 
 Son Kyung-won as   Gong Chan-seok 
 Kim Young-hoon as Jang Hyo-jun 
 Kim Si-eun as Kwon Saet-byeol  
 Shin Soo-hyun as Min Hye-rin 
 Cha Se-young as Chae-yoon 
 Cho Jae-ryong as Kang Man-ho 
 Jang Hang-seon as Dong Bang Heon-yeop

Special appearances

Season 1
 Jo Jae-yoon as triad member (Ep. 1)
 Lee Jun-hyeok as nightclub manager (Ep. 1)
 Park Hyo-jun as police officer
 Kim Yoon-ah as Club Fever DJ (Ep. 9)
 Kim Hyung-kyu as Club Fever manager (Ep. 9)
 Kim Kwon as psychiatric doctor in Sungwun Mental Hospital (Ep. 16)

Season 2
 Lee Hae-young as Jang Kyung-hak, deceased Golden Time Dispatch Team Leader (Ep. 1–2)
 Jang Hee-jung as Baek Mi-ja / Wang Ok-ryeo (Ep. 4-5)
 Lee Sang-yi as Wang Ko (Cameraman) (Ep. 6–7)
 Park Eun-seok as Go David (Ep. 6–7)
 Yoo Hae-in as Zombie girl (Ep. 7)
 Lee Jung-shin as Lee Jae-il (using Cricket as an alias), a murderer (Ep. 8)
 Jae Hee as Son Ho-min (Ep. 8–9)

Season 3
 Ahn Se-ha as Kwak Dok-ki (Ep. 2–3)
 Heo Sung-tae as informant
 Lee Tae-ri as Tomoyuki (Ep. 2)
 Lee Yong-woo as Fujiyama Koichi

Season 4 
 Kim Ye-eun as Girl in Ha-eun's story (Ep.2)
 Kwon Yul as Bang Je-soo (Ep.14)

Production

Development and casting
On November 2, 2017, a source from OCN confirmed production for the second season of Voice. On April 17, 2018, it was confirmed that Lee Ha-na would be reprising her lead female role and Lee Jin-wook would be joining season 2 as the new male lead. OCN announced a third season to be broadcast in the first half of 2019, with Lee Ha-na and Lee Jin-wook confirmed to reprise their roles. The first script reading took place on May 23, 2018 at Studio Dragon in Sangam-dong, Seoul, South Korea. During the press conference of the second season, director Lee Seung-young shared that the season would have 12 episodes as the writer wrote season 2 with season 3 in mind.

In September 2018, OCN officially confirmed a third season scheduled to be broadcast in the first half of 2019. It was later announced that both Lee Ha-na and Lee Jin-wook had confirmed to reprise their roles. The first script reading took place in February 2019 at Studio Dragon in Sangam-dong, Seoul, South Korea.

Music

Part 1

Part 2

Part 3

Season 4

Part 1

Part 2

Part 3

Part 4

Part 5

Reception
OCN  announced that the VOD rights for “Voice” were sold to 56 countries including the United States, Canada, France, Switzerland, Hong Kong, Singapore, and more.

Controversy
Halfway airing through the series, the drama was submitted for Korea's censorship board review due to viewers' complaints of it showing excessive violence. It was subsequently issued an advisory warning. OCN then changed its viewing rating from the original of 15+ to 19+ for episodes 11, 12 and 16 in order to make the story as realistic as possible.

Viewership
Ratings for the first season set new records for OCN dramas when it aired in South Korea, proving to be a hit among viewers. It is one of the highest rated dramas in Korean cable television history and ranked first among cable TV dramas for many consecutive weeks.

Upon its premiere, the second season set the record for the highest premiere rating of an OCN television series. Despite its shorter run, the second season surpassed the first season's ratings and eventually became the highest-rated OCN television series, breaking viewership records previously held by Tunnel (2017).

Season 1

Season 2

Season 3

Season 4

Awards and nominations

Adaptations
A Japanese remake, titled Voice: 110 Emergency Control Room,   aired from July 13 to September 19, 2019 on Nippon TV at 22.00 JST

A Thai remake, titled Voice สัมผัสเสียงมรณะ, was aired from November 4, to December 24, 2019 on True4U.

Notes

References

External links
   (season 1)
   (season 2)
   (season 3)
   (season 4)
  (season 1)
  (season 2)
  (season 3)
  (season 4)
 
  (season 1 and 2)

OCN television dramas
Korean-language television shows
2017 South Korean television series debuts
South Korean thriller television series
South Korean crime television series
South Korean television series remade in other languages
Television series by Studio Dragon
Television series by KeyEast
Television shows set in Osaka
Zainichi Korean culture